Nalgonda mandal is one of the 59 mandals in Nalgonda district of the Indian state of Telangana. It is under the administration of Nalgonda revenue division and the headquarters are located at Nalgonda.

Towns and villages 

 census, the mandal has 30 settlements. It includes 1 town, 4 outgrowths and 25 villages.

The settlements in the mandal are listed below:

Note: M-Municipality

See also 
 List of mandals in Telangana, نلگنڑہ منڑل کی فہرست

References 

Mandals in Nalgonda district